Liulitun Subdistrict is a subdistrict within Chaoyang District, Beijing, China. As of 2020, it has a total population of 75,226.

The subdistrict got its name from Liulitun, which was named so due to the fact that during Qing dynasty, the village was six Chinese miles away from Dongzhimen, a former city gate of Beijing city wall.

History 
The subdistrict was founded in 1987. In 1993, area east of Honglingjin Park was incorporated into Liulitun Subdistrict.

Administrative Division 
In the year 2021, Liulitun Subdistrict has 12 communities under it:

References 

Chaoyang District, Beijing
Subdistricts of Beijing